was a railway station in Yūbari, Hokkaidō, Japan. The station was closed when the Yubari Branch Line ceased operation on 31 March 2019.

Lines
Minami-Shimizusawa Station was served by the Sekisho Line Yūbari Branch. The station was numbered "Y22".

Station layout
The station had a ground-level side platform serving one track. Kitaca was not available.

Adjacent stations

Surrounding  area

References

Railway stations in Hokkaido Prefecture
Railway stations in Japan opened in 1962
Railway stations closed in 2019